Salt Lake Raiders is a 1950 American Western film directed by Fred C. Brannon and starring  Allan Lane.

Plot
Ghost-town crooks make a lawman (Allan "Rocky" Lane), a falsely accused escaped convict (Myron Healey), and an old coot (Eddy Waller) look for hidden gold.

Cast
Allan Lane as Deputy Marshal Rocky Lane 
Black Jack as Black Jack 
Eddy Waller as Nugget Clark
Roy Barcroft as Brit Condor
Martha Hyer as Helen Thornton
Byron Foulger as Lawyer John Sutton
Myron Healey as Fred Mason
Clifton Young as Luke Condor
Stanley Andrews as Chief Marshal
Rory Mallinson as Sheriff
Kenneth MacDonald as Deputy Marshal Tom
George Chesebro as Stage Driver Ben

References

External links 
 

1950 films
American Western (genre) films
1950 Western (genre) films
Republic Pictures films
Films directed by Fred C. Brannon
American black-and-white films
1950s English-language films
1950s American films